Richland Township is the name of some places in the U.S. state of Pennsylvania:

Richland Township, Allegheny County, Pennsylvania
Richland Township, Bucks County, Pennsylvania
Richland Township, Cambria County, Pennsylvania
Richland Township, Clarion County, Pennsylvania
Richland Township, Venango County, Pennsylvania

Pennsylvania township disambiguation pages